Group A of the 2001 Fed Cup Asia/Oceania Zone Group II was one of two pools in the Asia/Oceania Zone Group II of the 2001 Fed Cup. Three teams competed in a round robin competition, with the top two teams qualifying for the play-offs.

Hong Kong vs. Fiji

Singapore vs. Fiji

Hong Kong vs. Singapore

See also
Fed Cup structure

References

External links
 Fed Cup website

2001 Fed Cup Asia/Oceania Zone